Matt Slocum (born 27 December 1972) is a guitarist, cellist, pianist and composer, known for his work as the principal songwriter and lead guitarist of Sixpence None the Richer.

Biography  
Born in Rhode Island to Joseph and Hildegard Slocum, his family moved to New Braunfels, Texas, when he was eight months old, and opened a book store. In 1991, while a senior at New Braunfels High School, Slocum played guitar with Chris Taylor on a garage-band tape release called A Place to Hide Away (Part 1). He was a member of Love Coma, a Christian rock band, and in the early 1990s he met vocalist Leigh Bingham Nash while attending the same church in New Braunfels, Texas. Slocum and Leigh formed Sixpence None the Richer; he and Nash are the band's only constant members. He co-wrote, with Nash, the song "Nervous In the Light of Dawn" for Nash's debut solo album Blue on Blue.
In 2006, Slocum toured with the band The Choir, playing bass. He has also played guitar with Over the Rhine, and played bass in the band the Astronaut Pushers.
Slocum played cello on Viva Voce's first album, Hooray for Now. As studio guitarist and cellist, he has recorded on albums by artists Julie Miller, Plumb, Wes King, Switchfoot, Hammock, Lost Dogs, The Choir, Dividing the Plunder, Threefold, and Brooke Waggoner.  He also appeared as cellist on the Chris Rice DVD Inside Out.

Discography 

 The Fatherless and the Widow (1994)
 This Beautiful Mess (1995)
 Sixpence None the Richer (1997)
 Divine Discontent (2002)
 The Dawn of Grace (2008)
 Lost in Transition (2012)

References

1972 births
Living people
People from Nashville, Tennessee
Musicians from New Braunfels, Texas
Musicians from Nashville, Tennessee
People from New Braunfels, Texas